Three ships of the Royal Navy have borne the name HMS Megaera, after one of the Erinyes of Greek and Roman mythology, Megaera:

  was a 14-gun fireship launched in 1783 and sold in 1817.
  was a wood paddle sloop launched in 1837 and wrecked in 1843.
  was an iron screw frigate launched in 1849, converted to a troopship in 1855 and beached in 1871 as unseaworthy.

Royal Navy ship names